Oumi is a Swedish television series in 24 episodes broadcast on Kanal 5.

The series was directed by Hans Pihl and Pontus Ströbaek, the host was Mi Ridell as Oumi. Ridell used make-up, posed as Japanese and told famous Swedes that they were interviewed for a program called Good Morning Tokyo. Oumi conducted the interviews so that the interviewee usually was uncomfortable or embarrassed before finally unmasking.

The series was a comedy inspired in Wendy van Dijk's character Ushi Hirosaki.

External links 
Web page on kanal5.se archived on the Internet Archive from the original

Fictional interviewers
Fictional reporters
Kanal 5 (Swedish TV channel) original programming